Garden River, also known as Garden Creek, is an unincorporated community in northern Alberta, Canada within Wood Buffalo National Park. It is a First Nations community of the Little Red River Cree Nation.

History 

Lying 5 kilometers inside the original 1922 boundary of Wood Buffalo National Park, this predominantly First Nations community was never officially recognized by the federal government, until a special amendment to the Canada National Parks Act removed the community from the park on June 19, 2017. Corresponding orders-in-council from the provincial government of Alberta are expected to facilitate the creation of a new Indian reserve encompassing Garden River's territory. This would become the third reserve of the Little Red River Cree Nation, after Fox Lake 162 and John D'Or Prairie 215.

Demographics 

Most of the residents speak Woods Cree at home.

See also 
List of communities in Alberta

References

External links 
Little Red River Cree Nation

Cree
Designated places in Alberta
First Nations in Alberta
Unincorporated communities in Alberta